The Embassy of East Timor (Timor-Leste) in Washington, D.C. is the diplomatic mission of the East Timor to the United States. It is located at 4201 Connecticut Ave NW, in the Forest Hills neighborhood.

The Ambassador is Domingos Sarmento Alves.

References

External links
Official website

East Timor
Washington, D.C.
East Timor–United States relations
East Timor